Norbugang Gewog may refer to:

 Norbugang Gewog (Pemagatshel)
 Norbugang Gewog (Samtse)